Krusada is a Philippine reality drama program which as aired on ABS-CBN from December 9, 2010, to February 21, 2013.

Availability
Krusada is aired every Thursday after Bandila on ABS-CBN. With replays every Saturday 1:30 PM on ABS-CBN News Channel. The program also airs in DZMM TeleRadyo.

External links
Krusada at ABS-CBN.com

ABS-CBN News and Current Affairs shows
ABS-CBN original programming
Philippine reality television series
2010 Philippine television series debuts
2013 Philippine television series endings
Filipino-language television shows